Chacraccocha (possibly from Quechua chakra field, qucha lake, "field lake") is a mountain in the Raura mountain range in the Andes of Peru, about  high. It is located in the boundary between the regions of Huánuco and in Pasco.

References

Mountains of Peru
Mountains of Huánuco Region
Mountains of Pasco Region
Lakes of Peru
Lakes of Pasco Region